Elizabeth Ryan (1892–1979) was an American tennis player.

Elizabeth Ryan may also refer to:

Elizabeth Ryan (field hockey) (born 1985), field hockey striker from New Zealand
Elizabeth Ryan (swimmer) (1923–1998), American freestyle swimmer
Gig Ryan (born 1956), Australian poet